The Free Speech Flag is a symbol of personal liberty used to promote freedom of speech. Designed by artist John Marcotte, the flag and its colors correspond to a cryptographic key which enabled users to copy HD DVDs and Blu-ray Discs. It was created on May 1, 2007, during the AACS encryption key controversy.

Marcotte was motivated to create the flag after the Motion Picture Association of America (MPAA) and the Advanced Access Content System Licensing Administrator (AACS LA) began issuing cease and desist letters to websites publishing the key 09 F9 11 02 9D 74 E3 5B D8 41 56 C5 63 56 88 C0 (commonly referred to as 09-F9).

In response to attempts to remove the key from the Internet, netizens publicized the cryptographic key on the news aggregator website Digg (an example of the Streisand effect).

History

On April 30, 2007, a blogger named "Rudd-O" published the encryption key for HD DVDs and asked readers to share it widely. Knowledge of this numeric key value allowed users to bypass digital rights management (DRM) and copy HD DVDs that previously could not be duplicated. News media reported on this development and Digg, a news aggregator and social media website, provided a way for users to vote on stories they felt were most newsworthy. Votes by 15,000 Digg users drove an article about the encryption key to the front page of the site.

The Advanced Access Content System (AACS), the organization which controlled access to the HD DVD encryption key, sent a cease and desist letter to Digg on May 1, 2007.  In its letter, AACS claimed that by publishing news articles on its website that reported on the encryption key, the website itself was engaging in illegal activity. Articles by numerous journalists reporting on the news story were posted to Digg. Jay Adelson, the CEO of Digg, announced that the website would abide by the AACS' requests and self-censor articles reporting on the encryption key.

Adelson's decision to self-censor his website caused an unintended backlash from the Digg community in the form of the Streisand effect. "In trying to make the cracked issue go away", notes Jeremy Goldman in his 2012 book Going Social, "the AACS's letter (and Digg's response) succeeded only in making the story bigger." Digg users made sure, by their votes and online participation, that all front-page stories on Digg were about the encryption key. Digg founder Kevin Rose observed: "The Digg community is one that loves to have their voice heard, and this has been something that struck a chord with them."

After listening to complaints from Digg's community about Adelson's decision to self-censor news stories about the encryption key, Rose wrote a message to his users reversing this decision. He announced that Digg would stop self-censorship and he acknowledged that he understood the message from Digg's members: "After seeing hundreds of stories and reading thousands of comments, you've made it clear ... you'd rather see Digg go down fighting than bow to a bigger company. Effective immediately, we won't delete stories  or comments containing the code, and we will deal with whatever the consequences might be."

Design and message

John Marcotte, a writer and editor at the website Badmouth, created the Free Speech Flag with the intent of disseminating the secret HD DVD code on the Internet, eventually publishing it on the website on May 1, 2007. In his initial post announcing his flag, Marcotte criticized how the mere use of numbers had become intellectual property.

"We want to start a movement", Marcotte wrote. "A movement to reclaim personal liberties and decorporatize the laws of our nation."  He encouraged online viewers of his work to spread his message throughout the Internet and to freely publicize his work. "To that end we have made a flag, a symbol to show support for personal freedoms. Spread it as far and wide as you can."

Marcotte embedded the secret HD DVD key into the colors of the flag itself, using the flag hex code format colors #09F911 #029D74 #E35BD8 #4156C5 #635688.  By appending the byte "C0" to the bottom right corner of the flag, Marcotte implied that the act of publishing a number is "Crime Zero".  He originally released the flag "freely" with "rights for people to make similar, derivative works," but later released it into the public domain.

Impact

Soon after it was first published, bloggers publicized the Free Speech Flag across multiple websites, increasing its popularity and disseminating the forbidden code within the flag. The flag entered popular culture as Internet users chose creative ways to spread knowledge of the HD DVD encryption key.

Users wore the code emblazoned on T-shirts, added it to poems, integrated the code into the lyrics of hip hop songs, and created music utilizing its numeric values. Musician Keith Burgun composed a song using the code titled "Oh Nine, Eff Nine", and published his work on YouTube. The sole lyrics to the song were the numbers of the digital code itself: "09 F9 11 02 9D 74 E3 5B D8 41 56 C5 63 56 88 C0". "I thought it was a source of comedy that they were trying so futilely to quell the spread of this number," Burgun said. "The ironic thing is, because they tried to quiet it down it’s the most famous number on the Internet."

Matthew Rimmer, senior lecturer at Australian National University, commented upon the legality of the innovative ways Internet users like Marcotte chose to publicize the secret HD DVD code: "I don't think it's necessarily designed to stay within the bounds of the law. It's just a fun way to comment on what's happened. I think that it's designed to show that the law is absurd or ridiculous and should be abolished."

Antonio Ceraso of Pennsylvania State University placed the flag's conception within a larger framework—"the formation of a communal ethos...the 09 F9 tribe"—and posed the question:  "Would five striped colors arranged into a flag constitute an anti-circumvention device under the DMCA?"

The flag inspired Jeff Thompson, assistant professor and program director of Visual Art and Technology at the Stevens Institute of Technology, to create a sound file of the AACS encryption key as a melody. After a similar encryption key was cracked for the PlayStation 3 gaming system, a new flag was created by a different user as a tribute to Marcotte's original flag.

See also

 Cobra effect
 Freedom of information
 Hydra effect
 Illegal number
 Internet censorship

References

Further reading

External links

Activism flags
Freedom of speech
Internet memes
Political flags
Free Speech